Powder is a 2022 Indian Tamil-language thriller film directed by Vijay Sri G and starring Vidya Pradeep, Nikil Murukan and Shantini Deva. It was released on 25 November 2022.

Cast

Production
The film was launched in October 2020 with Vidya Pradeep announced to play the lead role. The director of the film, Vijay Sri G, who had earlier made Dha Dha 87 (2019), started Powder after his other film Pollatha Ulagil Bayangara Game entered the post-production phase. Nikil Murukan, a noted press relations officer in Tamil cinema, accepted terms to work as an actor in the film. It became his first full-fledged acting role following a number of cameo appearances. He requested Vijay Sri to name his character as Raghavan to reference the popular police officer portrayed by Kamal Haasan in Vettaiyaadu Vilaiyaadu (2006).

Soundtrack
Soundtrack was composed by Leander Lee Marty.
Ratha Ther - Leander Lee Marty
Saayam Pona - Velmurugan, Sruthi Sasidharan
No Soodu No Soranai - Gaana Bala

Reception
The film was released on 25 November 2022 across Tamil Nadu. A critic from Cinema Express wrote it was "a mirthless film with hardly any redemptive qualities" and that the film "reeks of amateur writing and abysmal craft". The reviewer added "the end result of Powder only manages to leave us with a poor aftertaste, especially with the film's ridiculous attempt at shocking the viewer coming in lieu of engaging and palatable cinema". In contrast, a reviewer from Maalai Malar gave Powder a positive review, noting that "it was worth a watch".

References

External links

2022 films
2020s Tamil-language films
Indian thriller films